Daniel Boucher (born October 7, 1971) is a Québécois musician.

Born in Montreal, he has released three studio albums; Dix Mille Matins on October 12, 1999, La patente on February 24, 2004 and Le soleil est sorti on November 11, 2008. From his own saying, "Le soleil est sorti" is his favourite of them.

In 2006, he portrayed Renfield in the Québec production of Dracula - Entre l'amour et la mort.

Discography
 1999: Dix Mille Matins
 2004: La Patente
 2007: La Patente / Live
 2007: Chansonnier / Live
 2008: Le Soleil est sorti
 2014: Toutte est temporaire

References

External links
 Official Daniel Boucher website
 Daniel Boucher on Myspace
 

1971 births
Living people
Canadian male musical theatre actors
Canadian male singers
Canadian rock singers
Canadian singer-songwriters
French-language singers of Canada
Singers from Montreal
Canadian male singer-songwriters